A mandrel is an object used to shape machined work, a tool component that grips or clamps materials to be machined, or a tool component that can be used to grip other moving tool components

Mandrel may also refer to:

 Mandrel (bending), a device inserted into a pipe or tube to keep it from collapsing during bending
 Mandrel (catheter), the metal guide for flexible catheters
Mandrel (electronics) was the code-name of a World War II electronic counter-measure used by the RAF.
 Mandrel Screen, a Royal Air Force aviation patrol in December 1942 employing the radar jammers during World War II 
 Mandrel wrapping, a technique used in multimode fiberoptics
Operation Mandrel, a series of 53 American nuclear tests in 1969 and 1970

See also
Mandrell
Mandrill